The Texas Department of Transportation (TxDOT ) is a Texas state government agency responsible for construction and maintenance of the state's immense state highway system and the support of the state's aviation, rail, and public transportation systems. TxDOT previously administered vehicle registration prior to the creation of the Texas Department of Motor Vehicles in November 2009.

The agency has been headquartered in the Dewitt C. Greer Building in Austin since 1933.

History

The Texas Legislature created the Texas Highway Department in 1916 to administer federal highway construction and maintenance. In 1975, its responsibilities increased when the agency merged with the Texas Mass Transportation Commission, resulting in the formation of the State Department of Highways and Public Transportation.

In 1986, the department started using "Don't Mess with Texas" as its slogan to reduce littering on Texas roadways, as part of a statewide advertising campaign. The phrase was prominently shown on road signs on major highways, as well as in television, radio, and print advertisements.  The slogan is still in use and remains very popular.

In 1991, the Legislature combined the State Department of Highways and Public Transportation, the Department of Aviation, and the Texas Motor Vehicle Commission to create the Texas Department of Transportation (TxDOT).

In 1997, the pre-existing Texas Turnpike Authority (TTA) was divided into two successor agencies: the North Texas Tollway Authority took responsibility for TTA assets in four North Texas counties, while the Turnpike Authority Division of Texas DOT was given jurisdiction over toll facilities in the rest of the state.

In 2005, as a result of House Bill 2702 the rail oversight functions of the Texas Railroad Commission were transferred to TxDOT.

In 2009, the Texas Department of Motor Vehicles was created by the state legislature, taking over some functions from TxDOT.

In 2016, the Texas A&M University Press published MILES and MILES of TEXAS; 100 Years of the Texas Highway Department.

Administration
TxDOT has approximately 12,000 employees. Marc Williams has served as its executive director since 2021. Williams had served as deputy executive director since 2015. He is assisted by one deputy director, Brandye Hendrickson. The department is organized into 25 geographical districts and 34 divisions.

Districts

TxDOT is one of the state's largest departments in terms of the number of subordinate offices – it maintains 25 geographical districts throughout the state.  The large number of departments is needed due to the large size of the state, the widely varying climate and soil conditions affecting public roads, and the differing needs of the local populace (urban vs. suburban vs. rural). In 2010, TxDOT was reorganized into four regions, North, South, East, and West. The regions are designated as Regional Support Centers. The number of districts remained the same. Each district, managed by a district engineer, is responsible for the design, location, construction, and maintenance of its area transportation systems. Local field offices within districts are known as area offices, and many districts also have separate maintenance offices, usually on a county-by-county basis. Functional divisions and offices headquartered in Austin provide administrative and technical support to the districts.

Divisions

Publications

Every month, TxDOT publishes Texas Highways, a magazine aimed at showcasing various aspects of the state, often by providing interesting travel information on a specific stretch of highway (or highways) in the state. TxDOT also publishes the annual Texas Travel Guide, which offers points of interests for all regions of Texas.

Horizon is a quarterly journal focusing on transportation policy issues and financing in particular.

Gallery

See also

References

External links

Department of Transportation, Texas
State departments of transportation of the United States
United States railroad regulation
Motor vehicle registration agencies
Government agencies established in 1991
1991 establishments in Texas